Patan railway station is a major railway station in Patan district, Gujarat, India on the Western line of the Western Railway network.

Patan is 108 km from Ahmedabad railway station. It is also connected by rail to Mehsana, Mumbai, Jodhpur and Okha. Work is in progress on Patan and Palanpur railway sections.

Trains 

The following trains halt at Patan railway station in both directions:

 Bhagat Ki Kothi–Bandra Terminus Express (via Bhildi)
 Bhagat Ki Kothi–Sabarmati Intercity Express
 Patan Mehsana Junction Passenger
 Patan–Sabamati Junction DEMU
 Patan– Ahmedabad Passenger
 Mumbai Dadar–Bhagat Ki Kothi Festival Special
 Dadar–Bikaner Festival Special

References 

Railway stations in Patan district
Ahmedabad railway division